Ceán Chaffin (born June 26, 1957) is an American film producer who has frequently collaborated with her husband, director David Fincher. She and her fellow producers were nominated for the Academy Award for Best Picture for The Curious Case of Benjamin Button (2008), The Social Network (2010), and Mank (2020). She won American Film Institute's AFI Awards for these films as well as for The Girl with the Dragon Tattoo (2011). Chaffin was nominated for Producers Guild of America's Producers of the Year Awards for the three aforementioned films and was also nominated for a British Academy Film Award for The Curious Case of Benjamin Button and The Social Network.

Filmography
 The Game (1997)
 Fight Club (1999)
 Panic Room (2002)
 Zodiac (2007)
 The Curious Case of Benjamin Button (2008)
 The Social Network (2010)
 The Girl with the Dragon Tattoo (2011)
 Gone Girl (2014)
 Mank (2020)
 The Killer (2023)

In addition to producing the above films, Chaffin was executive producer for the 2017 TV series Mindhunter.

References

External links
 

American film producers
Living people
Film producers from California
People from Los Angeles
American women film producers
21st-century American women
1957 births